Leonida Mario Pallotta (born September 25, 1910, in Rome) was an Italian professional football player.

He played 2 games in the 1930/31 season in the Serie A for A.S. Roma.

1910 births
Year of death missing
Italian footballers
Serie A players
A.S. Roma players
Cagliari Calcio players
Association football goalkeepers